Pavel Pazdírek (born 14 October 1937) is a retired swimmer from Czechoslovakia who won a silver medal in the 200 m butterfly at the 1958 European Aquatics Championships. He competed in the same event at the 1960 Summer Olympics, but did not reach the final.

References

1937 births
Living people
Swimmers at the 1960 Summer Olympics
Olympic swimmers of Czechoslovakia
Sportspeople from Brno
Czech male swimmers
European Aquatics Championships medalists in swimming
Czechoslovak male swimmers
Universiade medalists in swimming
Universiade bronze medalists for Czechoslovakia
Medalists at the 1959 Summer Universiade